LMN may refer to:

 Langsomt Mot Nord, a musical group
 LMN (TV channel)
 Lower motor neuron
 LMN Architects